The Sourdough Lodge (originally known as Hart's Road House) was built in Alaska between 1903 and 1905 of logs. It was one of a number of roadhouses built along the Valdez Trail (now known as the Richardson Highway). It was designated a National Historic Landmark on June 2, 1978 as it was the oldest continuously-operating roadhouse in Alaska.

It was destroyed by fire in 1992, leading to the withdrawal of its National Historic Landmark status in 1993. In 1994, the lodge was delisted from the National Register of Historic Places.

See also
National Register of Historic Places listings in Copper River Census Area, Alaska

References

1905 establishments in Alaska
Buildings and structures completed in 1905
Buildings and structures in Copper River Census Area, Alaska
Former National Historic Landmarks of the United States
Former National Register of Historic Places in Alaska